Pankaj Mohindroo is the Founder and National President of Indian Cellular Association (ICA), the apex body of mobile industry in India.

He is also the Chairman of the Special Task Force set up by the Department of Electronics and Information Technology, Government of India to transform India's mobile and electronics manufacturing eco-system in order to boost domestic manufacturing, contribute to Indian Prime Minister Narendra Modi's ambitious 'Make in India' programme and to minimise India's import dependency in this field.

Mr Mohindroo is also the founder and Honorary Secretary of Telecom Sector Skill Council (TSSC), a not- for-profit body set up jointly by the Cellular Operators Association of India (COAI), Indian Cellular Association (ICA) and Telecom Centres of Excellence (TCOE) under the aegis of National Skill Development Council (NSDC) to up-skill, train and certify around 5 million people in 150 trades in the telecom industry over the next 10 years to ensure adequate availability of skilled manpower to boost growth and productivity in the Indian telecom sector.
Earlier as Chairman of Manufacturing Advisory Committees (2006 & 2010), Mr Mohindroo was instrumental in establishing and setting up the roadmap for manufacturing of mobile and components industry in India.
His policy recommendations and advisories have contributed immensely to making India as one of the biggest and most vibrant markets for mobile handsets in the world.
Mr Mohindroo is also Chairman and publisher of 'My Mobile', India's number one print and online magazine in the mobile sector.

Prior to founding ICA in 2002, Mr Mohindroo held senior positions with reputed corporate houses such as Tata Group, Oswal Group, Zee Group and Spring Convergence.
Mr Mohindroo is an alumnus of Punjab University and also a business graduate from Faculty of Management Studies, University of Delhi.

He has been a consumer activist also. As secretary of Belaire Owners Association, Gurgaon and President of Federation of Apartment Owner Association, he was the moving force behind Competition Commission of India (CCI) judgement imposing a penalty of Rs. 630 crore for abuse of dominance on DLF. He tirelessly fought for a meaningful regulatory and legal dispensation in real estate culminating in the enactment of Real Estate Regulatory Act (RERA).

References

1961 births
Living people